Hollow may refer to:

Natural phenomena
Hollow, a low, wooded area, such as a copse
Hollow (landform), a small vee-shaped, riverine type of valley 
Tree hollow, a void in a branch or trunk, which may provide habitat for animals

Places
Sleepy Hollow, New York, a municipality formerly known as North Tarrytown
Sleepy Hollow Cemetery,  Concord, Massachusetts

Arts, entertainment, and media

Fictional entities
Hollow (Marvel Comics), a mutant formerly known as Penance
Hollows, fictional beings in the manga and anime series Bleach; see List of Hollows in Bleach

Films
Hollow (2011 American film), a 2011 American drama film
Hollow (2011 British film), a 2011 British horror film
Hollow (2014 film), a 2014 Vietnamese horror film

Literature
Hollows (series), a series of novels and stories by Kim Harrison
"The Legend of Sleepy Hollow", by Washington Irving

Music 
 Hollow (band), a progressive power metal band from in Umeå, Sweden

Albums
 Hollow (Cesium 137 album), 2006
 Hollow (Digital Summer EP), 2008
 Hollow, a 2011 album by Cut Off Your Hands

Songs
 "Hollow" (Alice in Chains song), 2013
 "Hollow" (Godsmack song), 2006
 "Hollow" (Pantera song), 1992
 "Hollow" (Tori Kelly song), 2015
 "Hollow", by the 3rd and the Mortal from In This Room, 1997
 "Hollow", by Breaking Benjamin from Dark Before Dawn, 2015
 "Hollow", by Coldrain from The Enemy Inside, 2011
 "Hollow", by Cult of Luna from Cult of Luna, 2001
 "Hollow", by Darkest Hour from So Sedated, So Secure, 2001
 "Hollow", by Edge of Sanity from Infernal, 1997
 "Hollow", by Mayday Parade from Black Lines, 2015
 "Hollow", by Parkway Drive from Deep Blue, 2010
 "Hollow", by Rivers of Nihil from Where Owls Know My Name, 2018
 "Hollow", by Submersed from In Due Time, 2004
 "Hollow", by Theatre of Tragedy from Forever Is the World, 2009
 "Hollow", by Turnover from Magnolia, 2013
 "Hollow", by Wage War from Blueprints, 2015
 "Hollow", by Within the Ruins from Black Heart, 2020
 "Hollow", theme song for the game Final Fantasy VII Remake, 2020

See also
Cavity (disambiguation)
The Hollow (disambiguation)